The Princess Academy is a 1987 independent film comedy directed by Bruce A. Block and written by Sandra Weintraub.  It was filmed entirely in Yugoslavia near Zagreb and at Yadran Studios.

Plot
Cindy Cathcart (Lar Park-Lincoln) is a student out of place at an exclusive Swiss finishing school, Von Pupsin Academy.  A poor orphan, Cindy is attending on a scholarship, and is resented by her snobby peers as well as Fraulein Stinkenschmidt (Lu Leonard).  She soon finds allies:  her British roommate, an outgoing Texan, Lulu Belle (Britt Helfer), an Italian Mafiosi's daughter, Isabella (Barbara Rousek), and most crucial, the school's headmistress, Countess Von Pupsin (Eva Gabor).

Cast
 Lar Park-Lincoln as Cindy Cathcart
 Eva Gabor as Countess Von Pupsin
 Lu Leonard as Fraulein Stinkenschmidt
 Richard Paul as Drago
 Carole Davis as Sonia
 Bader Howar as Sarah
 Barbara Rousek as Isabella "Izzie"
 Britt Helfer as Lulu Belle
 Nathalie Tarkowski as Colette
 Shelley Pielou as Hillary Haverstock
 Yolande Palfrey as Pamela Lenox
 Robin Lermitte as Alexander "Alex" Snivelroe
 Eric Viellard as Pierre
 Igor Serdar as Sonny
 Jeremy Booker as William "Willy" Cavendish
 Kader Boukhanef as Samir

Release
The film was given a theatrical release in April 1987. After its theatrical run, the film was released on videocassette by Lightning Video. The film has yet to be released on DVD.

External links
 
 

1987 films
1987 comedy films
American comedy films
French comedy films
English-language French films
Empire International Pictures films
American independent films
English-language Yugoslav films
Films set in boarding schools
Yugoslav comedy films
1987 independent films
1980s English-language films
1980s American films
1980s French films